The Persian legislative election of 1921 was the first election held after the 1921 Persian coup d'état. Reformers' Party, led by Hassan Modarres was the majority party while Socialist Party was the main opposition.

References

1921 elections in Asia
Legislative
National Consultative Assembly elections
Politics of Qajar Iran